Kai Xiang Chew (born 11 July 1999) is a Malaysian figure skater.

Career
Chew is a three-time Malaysian senior national silver medalist (2014–2016) and the 2013 Malaysian junior national champion. He has competed in the final segment of one ISU Figure Skating Championship, the 2017 Four Continents, finishing 23rd. He has also competed in the 2016 and 2017 World Junior Figure Skating Championships, finishing 37th and 42nd, respectively.

Chew trained without a coach during the 2018–19 season.

Programs

Results 
CS: Challenger Series; JGP: Junior Grand Prix

References

External links
 

1999 births
Living people
People from Selangor
Malaysian male single skaters
Malaysian people of Chinese descent
Figure skaters at the 2016 Winter Youth Olympics
Figure skaters at the 2017 Asian Winter Games
Southeast Asian Games bronze medalists for Malaysia
Southeast Asian Games medalists in figure skating
Competitors at the 2017 Southeast Asian Games